Queen Sophia or Queen Sophie may refer to:
Sofia of Bavaria (1376–1425), Queen of Bohemia
Sophia of Halshany (1405?–1461), Queen of Poland
Sophie of Pomerania (1498–1568), Queen of Denmark and Norway
Sophie of Mecklenburg-Güstrow (1557–1631), Queen of Denmark and Norway
Sophie of Württemberg (1818–1877), Queen consort of the Netherlands
Sophia of Prussia (1870–1932), queen consort of Greece 
Queen Sofía of Spain (born 1938)